The Bioinformatics Open Source Conference (BOSC) is an academic conference on open-source programming and other open science practices in bioinformatics, organised by the Open Bioinformatics Foundation. The conference has been held annually since 2000 and is run as a two-day meeting either within Intelligent Systems for Molecular Biology (ISMB) conference or as a joint conference with the Galaxy community.

Program 
The conference is held as a single track consisting of presentations, poster sessions and two keynote talks by people of influence in open-source bioinformatics.

Since 2010, an informal two-day "CollaborationFest" (formerly Codefest) has been held directly preceding the conference.

History 
National Institutes of Health Associate Director for Data Science Philip Bourne and C. Titus Brown gave keynote talks at BOSC 2014.

BOSC 2016 was organized in Orlando, Florida from July 8–9 before the main ISMB conference.

In 2018 and 2020, BOSC partnered with Galaxy to organize two joint conferences called GCCBOSC and Bioinformatics Community Conference (BCC) respectively. The event in 2018 was held in Portland, Oregon. The BCC in 2020 took place online with two time schedules for eastern/western time zones

Since 2021, BOSC has been taking place within the ISMB conferences again. In 2023 BOSC will take place in Lyon, France between July 24-28 as part of the ISMB/ECCB conference.

Past conferences 
As of November 2022, there have been 23 BOSC held around the world, of those 20 were purely in-person conferences, 2 purely remote due to the COVID-19 pandemic and one that was organized as a hybrid meeting.

References

Computational science
Bioinformatics
Biology conferences